Tiana Clark is an American poet. Clark is the author of Equilibrium and I Can't Talk About The Trees Without The Blood. Her work has been recognized with a Rattle Poetry Prize and a Pushcart Prize.

Biography 
Clark received her B.A in Africana and Women’s Studies at TSU, then graduated from Vanderbilt University's M.F.A. program. She worked as the editor for the Nashville Review while at the university.

The chapbook Equilibrium was published by Bull City Press after the manuscript won the 2016 Frost Place Chapbook Competition. The book draws on religious themes and language to explore being both Black and a woman. I Can't Talk About The Trees Without The Blood, Clark's first full length collection, was published by the University of Pittsburgh Press in 2018.

Clark's poem "The Ayes Have It", a response to the killing of Trayvon Martin was adapted into a short film by Savanah Leaf. Her poem "BBHMM" won a 2019 Pushcart Prize.

Recognition 
 2015 Rattle Poetry Prize
 2016 Afaa Michael Weaver Award for Frost Place Chapbook Competition for Equilibrium
 2016 Academy of American Poets University Prize
 2017 Agnes Lynch Starrett Poetry Prize
 2017 Furious Flower's Gwendolyn Brooks Centennial Poetry Prize
 2017-2018 Jay C. and Ruth Halls Poetry Fellowship at the Wisconsin Institute of Creative Writing
 2019 Pushcart Prize
 2020 Kate Tufts Discovery Award

Works 
 Equilibrium: Poems Bull City Press, 2016. ISBN 9781495157646
 I Can't Talk About the Trees Without the Blood, University of Pittsburgh Press, 2018. ISBN 9780822965589

References 

Living people
American poets
American women poets
Southern Illinois University Edwardsville faculty
Vanderbilt University alumni
Year of birth missing (living people)